Ying Pun is a village in Sheung Shui, North District, Hong Kong.

Administration
Ying Pun is a recognized village under the New Territories Small House Policy. It is one of the villages represented within the Sheung Shui District Rural Committee. For electoral purposes, Ying Pun is part of the Sheung Shui Rural constituency, which is currently represented by Simon Hau Fuk-tat.

References

External links

 Delineation of area of existing village Ying Pun (Sheung Shui) for election of resident representative (2019 to 2022)

Sheung Shui
Villages in North District, Hong Kong